is a Japanese voice actress and singer. She is affiliated with Pro-Fit and signed to ZERO-A. For eroge works, she goes by the name .

Filmography

Television animation
Maji de Watashi ni Koi Shinasai! (2011); Tsubame Matsunaga
Fantasista Doll (2013); Puchitt, Yukage
Leviathan The Last Defense (2013); Ainsel
Silver Spoon (2013); Manami Sakae
The Severing Crime Edge (2013); Kozakura Zenigata
Tamako Market (2013); Kanna Makino
Silver Spoon 2 (2014); Manami Sakae
Love, Chunibyo and Other Delusions! Heart Throb (2014); Satone Shichimiya
Oneechan ga Kita (2014); Ichika Mizuhara
Saki: The Nationals (2014); Shiromi Kosegawa
Magimoji Rurumo (2014); Maaya Sawashita
Yuki Yuna is a Hero (2014); Karin Miyoshi
Selector Spread WIXOSS (2014); Anne
Gourmet Girl Graffiti (2015); Mei Tsuchida
Tantei Kageki Milky Holmes TD (2015); Melodia
My Wife is the Student Council President (2015); Sawatari
The Asterisk War (2015); Priscilla Urzaiz
Hybrid × Heart Magias Academy Ataraxia (2016); Hayuru Himekawa
Seiren (2017); Toka Maruishi
My Girlfriend Is Shobitch (2017); Saori Igarashi
Yuki Yuna is a Hero: Hero Chapter (2017); Karin Miyoshi
Miss Caretaker of Sunohara-sou (2018); Mea Uchifuji
Circlet Princess (2019); Yūka Sasaki
Wise Man's Grandchild (2019); Yuri Carlton
Re:Stage! Dream Days♪ (2019); Nagisa Himura
Fire in His Fingertips (2019); Ryo Rujihashi (complete version)
Interspecies Reviewers (2020); Bi Bananan, Spirette
Assault Lily Bouquet (2020); Shinobu Izue
King's Raid: Successors of the Will (2020); Selene
Dogeza: I Tried Asking While Kowtowing (2020); Urara Toyofusa, Rui Sukiyabashi
Boruto: Naruto Next Generations (2020); Mia, Tsubaki Kurogane
Yuki Yuna is a Hero: The Great Mankai Chapter (2021); Karin Miyoshi
Princess Connect! Re:Dive Season 2 (2022); Kūka

Original video animation
Koe de Oshigoto! (2010), Hazuki Nōge

Film animation
Tamako Love Story (2014), Kanna Makino
Love, Chunibyo & Other Delusions! Take on Me (2018), Satone Shichimiya

Video games
Flowers series (2014–2017), Ichigo Sasaki, Ringo Sasaki
Kemono Friends (2015), Dororo (Girl Type) 
Yuki Yuna is a Hero: Memory of the Forest (2015), Karin Miyoshi
Alternative Girls (2017), Ren Agatsuma
The Expression Amrilato (2017), Rin Takatō
Yuki Yuna is a Hero: Hanayui no Kirameki (2017), Karin Miyoshi
Princess Connect! Re:Dive (2018), Kūka Tomi
Fire Emblem Three Houses (2019), Dorothea
Itsuka no Memorajxo ~Kotonoha Amrilato~ (2019), Rin Takatō
Azur Lane (2019), HMS Abercombie; IJN Ryūhō
Action Taimanin (2021), Asuka Koukawa
Naraka: Bladepoint (2021), Kurumi
Girls' Frontline: Project Neural Cloud (2022), Antonina, Banxsy
World II World  (2022), Annette

References

External links
 Official agency profile 
 Juri Nagatsuma at ZERO-A 
 
 

1988 births
Living people
Japanese women pop singers
Japanese nurses
Japanese video game actresses
Japanese voice actresses
Voice actresses from Hokkaido
Singers from Hokkaido